"Batko" is a nickname that may refer to:
 Almir Čehajić (born 1962), Bosnian talk show host and actor
 Nestor Makhno (1888 – 1934), Ukrainian anarcho-communist revolutionary and Russian Civil War commander
 Edmund Różycki (1827 – 1893), Polish general in the January Uprising
 Veselin Vlahović (born 1969), Montenegrin Serb war criminal

See also
BATCO